The 1848 United States presidential election in Kentucky took place on November 7, 1848, as part of the 1848 United States presidential election. Voters chose 12 representatives, or electors to the Electoral College, who voted for President and Vice President.

Kentucky voted for the Whig candidate, Zachary Taylor, over Democratic candidate Lewis Cass. Taylor won Kentucky by a margin of 14.92%.

Results

References

Kentucky
1848
1848 Kentucky elections